David Strader (February 24, 1955 – October 1, 2017) was an American sportscaster, primarily known for his play-by-play commentary of ice hockey. During his career, he worked on telecasts for the Detroit Red Wings, Florida Panthers, Phoenix Coyotes and Dallas Stars of the National Hockey League (NHL). He also worked nationally in the United States for ESPN, ABC, Versus, NBC, and NBCSN.

On April 17, 2017 the Hockey Hall of Fame announced that Strader was the 2017 recipient of the Foster Hewitt Memorial Award for his outstanding contributions to play-by-play broadcasting of the game of ice hockey.

While hockey was his primary focus, he also called college basketball, WNBA, and NBA D-League games.

Biography
A native of Glens Falls, New York, Strader honed his broadcasting skills at the college radio station WMUA 91.1 while studying for his Bachelor of Arts in Communication Studies at the University of Massachusetts Amherst.

Broadcasting career

Local work
Strader's professional broadcasting career began as the radio announcer and public relations director for the Adirondack Red Wings of the AHL from 1979 to 1985. A two-time New York State Broadcasters Association honoree, Strader was named the AHL's top public relations professional in 1984.

In 1985, the NHL's Detroit Red Wings called Strader up from the farm club, and he took over the play-by-play duties, calling TV games on both WKBD and PASS Sports alongside Mickey Redmond until 1996. Strader called games for the Florida Panthers for the 2005–06 and 2006–07 seasons when not calling games for NBC or Versus. Strader was hired by the Phoenix Coyotes on July 2, 2007. He was reunited with his former ESPN and ABC partner, Darren Pang, for Coyotes broadcasts for two seasons. With no television contract in place for Coyotes games, Pang left in 2009 to join the Blues. Strader was joined in the broadcast booth by former NHL player Tyson Nash.

In July 2011, Strader left his position with the Coyotes to accept a full-time job with NBC/Versus. He joined the NHL Dallas Stars as their TV play-by-play voice at the start of the 2015-2016 NHL season.

In June 2016, Strader was diagnosed with cholangiocarcinoma, a fairly rare and aggressive form of cancer of the bile duct. During a break in his treatment, he returned to the broadcast booth on February 18, 2017, a 4-3 overtime home win against the Tampa Bay Lightning. After the game, the Stars saluted Strader at center ice.

Strader broadcast all five games of that Dallas home stand including one on NBC. In April 2017, he also broadcast games in the first round Stanley Cup playoff series between the Washington Capitals and Toronto Maple Leafs on NBC networks.

National work

After long time ESPN broadcaster Tom Mees died from drowning in 1996, Strader was hired by the cable network to take the vacant play-by-play spot on National Hockey Night broadcasts. Strader was usually paired with Darren Pang and Brian Engblom on the network's secondary hockey broadcast team. When ABC got the NHL broadcast network contract in 2000, Strader worked for them as well. He also called NHL games for Fox in the mid-1990s, and the Stanley Cup Finals for NHL International from 1997-2015.

He moved to NBC and Versus when they got the NHL contracts in 2005. Strader also provided hockey play-by-play for NBC's coverage of the 2006 Winter Olympics in Turin, Italy, the 2010 Winter Olympics in Vancouver, British Columbia, and the 2014 Winter Olympics in Sochi, Russia. Strader served as a last-minute play-by-play replacement for Mike Emrick on NBC's coverage of the NHL Winter Classic between the Detroit Red Wings and Chicago Blackhawks on January 1, 2009, when Emrick was unable to broadcast the game due to laryngitis. Strader also called the 2011 NHL Heritage Classic on Versus, where the Montreal Canadiens played the Calgary Flames at McMahon Stadium in Calgary, Alberta.

In 2012 Strader covered the Battle 4 Atlantis men's college basketball preseason tournament on the NBC Sports Network alongside Donny Marshall.

Death
Strader died on October 1, 2017, at the age of 62 at his Glens Falls home, after his battle with bile duct cancer.

The Hockey Hall of Fame had announced earlier that year on April 17 that Strader was the 2017 recipient of the Foster Hewitt Memorial Award, but his actual induction ceremony was scheduled months later on November 13. At the time of the announcement, Strader stated that he was looking forward to the ceremony, saying that it was the greatest honor he had ever received. Due to his death, Strader's sons accepted the award  posthumously at the November induction ceremony on his behalf.

References

External links
Sunsport TV entry
Florida Panthers entry
USA Today article
NHL news
Versus.com article
Phoenix Coyotes entry
Voiceover artist page

1955 births
2017 deaths
American Hockey League broadcasters
American television sports announcers
Arizona Coyotes announcers
College basketball announcers in the United States
Dallas Stars announcers
Deaths from cancer in New York (state)
Deaths from cholangiocarcinoma
Detroit Red Wings announcers
Foster Hewitt Memorial Award winners
Florida Panthers announcers
National Hockey League broadcasters
NBA G League broadcasters
Olympic Games broadcasters
Sportspeople from Glens Falls, New York
Writers from New York (state)
Women's college basketball announcers in the United States
Women's National Basketball Association announcers